Parker's Opera House, also known as Opera House Store, Woolworth's and Parker Place, is a historic building located in Mason City, Iowa, United States. It was designed by the prominent Des Moines architect William Foster. Cousins H. G. and A. T. Parker built this structure as an opera house, which was the first one in the community. While it initially filled a need in Mason City, it was replaced by more modern theatres around the turn of the 20th century. The third floor was created in the building in 1909 when it was placed across the middle of the auditorium. The first floor initially housed a clothing store, and F. W. Woolworth Company occupied it beginning in the mid-1920s, and the upper floors housed the local offices of the Standard Oil Company at the same time. The two-story addition in the rear was built in the 1960s. The first floor was redesigned in 1997 for Central Park Dentistry.  The upper floors were converted into apartments in 2013.

Stone was used for both structural and decorative purposes. A metal cornice caps the main facade. The building was individually listed on the National Register of Historic Places in 1998, and as a contributing property in the Mason City Downtown Historic District in 2005.

References

Theatres completed in 1883
Apartment buildings in Mason City, Iowa
National Register of Historic Places in Mason City, Iowa
Victorian architecture in Iowa
Opera houses on the National Register of Historic Places in Iowa
Individually listed contributing properties to historic districts on the National Register in Iowa